Stockett is a census-designated place and unincorporated community in Cascade County, Montana, United States. Its population was 169 as of the 2010 census. Stockett has a post office with ZIP code 59480.

This company town was named for Cottonwood Coal Company manager Lewis Stockett. The mines stopped operating after diesel for railroad engines and natural gas for home heating were introduced. The town remains a bedroom community for Great Falls and serves area farmers and ranchers.

Demographics

Climate
According to the Köppen Climate Classification system, Stockett has a semi-arid climate, abbreviated "BSk" on climate maps.

Education
Centerville Public Schools educates students from kindergarten through 12th grade. They serve the communities of Centerville, Sand Coulee, Tracy and Stockett. Centerville High School is a Class C school. They are known as the Miners.

References

Census-designated places in Cascade County, Montana
Census-designated places in Montana
Unincorporated communities in Montana
Unincorporated communities in Cascade County, Montana